is a fictional character of the manga series Jujutsu Kaisen created by Gege Akutami. A first-year student at Tokyo Jujutsu High, an academy to hone cursed techniques to fight against cursed spirits arising from negative emotions from humans, she is under the tutelage of Satoru Gojo alongside Yuji Itadori and Megumi Fushiguro. She is a transfer student from Morioka whose hotheadedness and brashness contrasts with the other first-year students' altruism and stoicism. 

In the Jujutsu Kaisen anime adaptation, she is voiced by Asami Seto in Japanese and Anne Yatco in English. Her character has been widely praised by critics alongside other female characters in the series for being more layered and true to herself than other female shōnen characters.

Concept and creation 
Her name, Nobara, was meant by creator Gege Akutami to be "thorny", with the kanji characters for "No" and "Bara" meaning wild and rose while the character used to denote "Kugi" in her last name means nail or peg in order to demonstrate the two sides of her personality being rebellious and refined. He came up with her name at the same time as he came up with her powers and abilities, as they come hand-in-hand with each other. Akutami found her dialogue to be the easiest to write of the three main characters, but struggled with her composure in action scenes. Akutami felt it interesting to give her the sharp desire to go to Tokyo contrasting against her grandmother's wish for her to be raised normally in her small hometown.

Nobara was designed to be more true to herself than the other two protagonists, her authenticity on full display at multiple points in the series including during the Kyoto Goodwill Exchange event where she declares that she will only ever be herself and refuses to try to follow expectations from others. According to Akutami, she is best described by the songs "Seishun Kyosokyoku" by Sunny Day Service and "Ano Depaato" by Natsuko Nisshoku which contrast rock with heartfelt vocals and plucky piano playing to show her country upbringing and creativity. 

According to Anne Yatco, her English voice actress, "she is confident, sassy, and snarky—and I love all of it! I also really appreciate that the dynamic between Nobara, Yuji, and Megumi isn’t affected by their gender. So, even though she’s “the girl” in the group, no one treats Nobara with kid gloves or thinks that she’s weaker than them." She also touched on Nobara's journey of self-discovery after leaving her home, saying that "I really came into my own as a person after l left home. I think Nobara wants to grow, not just as a sorcerer but also as a human being, and she outgrew her hometown long ago." Japanese voice actress Asami Seto struggled to voice Nobara as her own personality contrasts heavily with Nobara's brashness, and had to consult and rehearse many times with the producers to get the personality down through her voice acting.

Appearances 
She first appears in "Chapter 3" of the manga after arriving in Tokyo by train. She is introduced to the other first-year sorcerers by Gojo, and aids Yuji in rescuing a child from a cursed spirit in an apartment complex. Although she initially expresses distaste for Yuji and Megumi, the trio become fast friends as they attend school together. She is present during the "cursed womb" invasion of a detention facility, though is taken out early in battle after being separated from the others. After training with the second-year students in preparation for the Exchange Event against Kyoto Jujutsu High, she is upset and annoyed when Yuji reveals that he has secretly been alive for weeks without telling his friends. 

During the battle with the Kyoto students, she argues about her worth and how she ignores the rules set by jujutsu society about being a female sorcerer, but is knocked out after being shot by Mai with a rubber bullet. While investigating cursed wombs known as "Death Paintings" with Yuji and Megumi, she helps Yuji kill one of the attackers but realizes too late that they were not actually cursed spirits but had a physical form, meaning they had human ancestry. She tells Yuji afterwards that she feels no regrets about having to kill other humans. After this incident, Nobara and Megumi discuss how Itadori's survival puts others in danger, due to Sukuna's presence in his body attracting dangerous cursed spirits that contain his fingers. 

In the "Shibuya Incident" arc, Nobara is one of many jujutsu sorcerers dispatched to stop the cursed spirits from waging their war against humans. She aids the other sorcerers in the battle and eventually comes across Mahito, a cursed spirit with the ability to reshape souls and fatally disfigure opponents simply by touching them. During the battle, she slips up in her attack strategy, and Mahito touches the right side of her face. Her life and most cherished relationships (including Yuji, Megumi, Gojo, and her other comrades from Jujutsu High) flash before her eyes, and she remembers her greatest regret of not being able to reunite with Saori, a girl from Tokyo who was ostracized and forced to leave her hometown. In her final waking moments, she bids farewell to Yuji and asks him to tell their friends that "it wasn't so bad", before her face is blasted open due to the effects of Mahito's transfiguration, losing her right eye and putting her on the brink between life and death.

Powers and abilities 
Nobara possesses an extremely high pain tolerance, tactical intellect, and a careful understanding of jujutsu arts. Her innate jujutsu techniques are the Straw Doll technique, allowing her to use a straw doll to attack her opponent from a distance by hitting a nail with a cursed energy-imbued hammer, such that curses feel whatever she inflicts onto the straw doll, and Resonance, which allows her to turn cursed technique attacks affecting her own body back on the user. The Straw Doll technique is based on the ushi no toki mairi, who are portrayed as women dressed in white that lay upon cursed on people using a straw doll, hammer and nails which is a traditional method of inflicting curses. She is also highly proficient in using her hammer to launch nails at enemies, causing both physical and cursed energy damage to her opponent when they make contact, and can make the nails explode in a physical technique called Hairpin. In addition to her standard abilities, she has been able to a Cursed Energy Manipulation – Black Flash which creates a spatial distortion when the user comes into contact with the impact of cursed energy in a 0.000001 second window of a physical attack. It was revealed in the Volume extras that Nobara's grandmother is a sorcerer with the same abilities and was taught to use the technique before enrolling as a student in Tokyo Metropolitan Curse Technical College.

In the official second Light Novel for Jujutsu Kaisen, it was revealed that Nobara can improvise the usage of her technique if she does not have access to her weapons. Using her heels as a nail and a makeshift doll out of rope, she was able to activate her Straw Doll Technique to defeat an opponent.

Reception 
Reception of Nobara’s character has been highly positive, with many critics and fans comparing her favorably to other female shōnen protagonists. Ana Diaz of Polygon praised Nobara's inclusion in Jujutsu Kaisen and the series' portrayal of women as a whole. She called a scene where Nobara calling out society's standards on gender roles "poignant" and "stunning", adding that "the scene has staying power, because Jujutsu Kaisen goes a step further than avoiding gender tropes...It’s not like there’s any right way for these young women to deal with the unique pressures they face. The story lets them disagree, and fight for their perspectives and their place." Komla Kwao praised the way Nobara's depiction was more than just a "clichéd, high school 'mean girl' who’s obsessed with her physical appearance and incapable of empathy" and how she and fellow sorcerer Maki Zenin "wholeheartedly embraced each other at first glance with no forced rivalry between them just because they’re both women." Theo J Ellis of AnimeMotivation said of Nobara: "She's undeniably independent, is an individual, and is NEVER reduced to a girl needing help from the knight in shining armor." 

Barrett Edwards Smith of Game Rant highlighted the way how "despite her aggressive personality, Nobara still embraces her femininity" and how she is more complex than being "traditionally female or not." Other praise was focused on how Nobara is "loud, aggressive, and always speaks her mind. However, she is more complex than being a mere badass fighter." James Beckett from Anime News Network listed her as his favorite anime character from 2021 due to her aggressive personality and how she stands out in the story.

At the 6th Crunchyroll Anime Awards, Nobara won the award for Best Girl.

References 

Anime and manga characters who use magic
Anime and manga characters with superhuman strength
Comics characters introduced in 2018
Crunchyroll Anime Awards winners
Fictional Japanese people in anime and manga
Fictional blade and dart throwers
Fictional characters with energy-manipulation abilities
Fictional demon hunters
Fictional exorcists
Fictional female martial artists
Fictional ghost hunters
Fictional hammer fighters
Female characters in anime and manga
Martial artist characters in anime and manga
Teenage characters in anime and manga